

Rugby sevens

International rugby sevens events
 January 6 – 14: 2018 Sudamérica Rugby Sevens in  Punta del Este &  Viña del Mar
  Academy defeated , 34–7, to win their first Sudamérica Rugby Sevens title.
  took third place and  took fourth place.
 July 12 – 14: 2018 World University Rugby Sevens Championship in  Swakopmund
 July 20 – 22: 2018 Rugby World Cup Sevens at AT&T Park in  San Francisco
 Men:  defeated , 33–12, to win their second consecutive and third overall Men's Rugby World Cup Sevens title.
 Women:  defeated , 29–0, to win their second consecutive Women's Rugby World Cup Sevens title.

2018 Rugby Europe Sevens Grand Prix Series
 May 19 & 20: ERSS #1 in  Moscow
 Cup: ; Plate: ; Bowl: 
 June 30 & July 1: ERSS #2 in  Marcoussis
 Cup: ; Plate: ; Bowl: 
 July 7 & 8: ERSS #3 in  Exeter
 Cup: ; Plate: ; Bowl: 
 September 8 & 9: ERSS #4 in  Łódź (final)
 Cup: ; Plate: ; Bowl:

2017–18 World Rugby Sevens Series
 December 1 & 2, 2017: WRSS #1 in  Dubai
 Cup: ; Plate: ; Bowl: ; Shield: 
 December 9 & 10, 2017: WRSS #2 in  Cape Town
 Cup: ; Plate: ; Bowl: ; Shield: 
 January 26 – 28: WRSS #3 in  Sydney
 Cup: ; Plate: ; Bowl: ; Shield: 
 February 3 & 4: WRSS #4 in  Hamilton
 Cup: ; Plate: ; Bowl: ; Shield: 
 March 2 – 4: WRSS #5 in  Las Vegas
 Cup: ; Plate: ; Bowl: ; Shield: 
 March 10 & 11: WRSS #6 in  Vancouver
 Cup: ; Plate: ; Bowl: ; Shield: 
 April 6 – 8: WRSS #7 in  Hong Kong
 Cup: ; Plate: ; Bowl: ; Shield: 
 April 28 & 29: WRSS #8 in  National Stadium, Singapore
 Cup: ; Plate: ; Bowl: ; Shield: 
 June 2 & 3: WRSS #9 in  London
 Cup: ; Plate: ; Bowl: ; Shield: 
 June 8 – 10: WRSS #10 (final) in  Paris
 Cup: ; Plate: ; Bowl: ; Shield:

2017–18 World Rugby Women's Sevens Series
 November 30 & December 1, 2017: WRWSS #1 in  Dubai
 Cup: ; Plate: ; Bowl: 
 January 26 – 28: WRWSS #2 in  Sydney
 Cup: ; Plate: ; Bowl: 
 April 21 & 22: WRWSS #3 in  Kitakyushu
 Cup: ; Plate: ; Bowl: 
 May 12 & 13: WRWSS #4 in  Langford, British Columbia
 Cup: ; Plate: ; Bowl: 
 June 8 – 10: WRWSS #5 (final) in  Paris
 Cup: ; Plate: ; Bowl:

Rugby union

National teams
 October 28, 2017 – April 14: ///// 2017–18 Rugby Europe Trophy
 Champions: ; Second: ; Third: 
 January 27 – March 3: ///// 2018 Americas Rugby Championship
 Champions: ; Second: ; Third: 
 February 2 – March 16: ///// 2018 Six Nations Under 20 Championship
 Champions: ; Second: ; Third: 
 February 2 – March 18: ///// 2018 Women's Six Nations Championship
 Champions: ; Second: ; Third: 
 February 3 – March 17: ///// 2018 Six Nations Championship
 Champions: ; Second: ; Third: 
 February 10 – March 18: ///// 2018 Rugby Europe Championship
 Champions: ; Second: ; Third: 
 April 28 – June 2: // 2018 Asia Rugby Championship
 Champions: ; Second: ; Third: 
 May 30 – June 17:  2018 World Rugby Under 20 Championship
  defeated , 33–25, to win their first World Rugby Under 20 Championship title.
  took third place.
 June 16 – August 18: ///// 2018 Africa Gold Cup
 Champions: ; Second: ; Third: 
 August 18 - October 6: 2018 Rugby Championship
 Champions: ; Second: ; Third: ; Fourth:

Club teams
 August 26, 2017 – June 2:  2017–18 Top 14
 Castres defeated Montpellier 29–13 in the final to win their fifth Top 14 title.
 September 1, 2017 – May 26:
  2017–18 Aviva Premiership
 Saracens defeated reigning champion Exeter Chiefs 27–10 in the final to win their third title in four years and fourth overall.
 //// 2017–18 Pro14
  Leinster defeated defending champion  Scarlets 40–32 in the final for the inaugural title of the Pro14 era and Leinster's fifth since Pro14 launched in 2001 as the Celtic League.
 October 12, 2017 – May 11: 2017–18 European Rugby Challenge Cup
  Cardiff Blues defeated  Gloucester 31–30 in the final at Bilbao for their second Challenge Cup crown.
 October 13, 2017 – May 12: 2017–18 British and Irish Cup
  Ealing Trailfinders defeated  Leinster A 22–7 to win their first British and Irish Cup title.
 October 13, 2017 – May 12: 2017–18 European Rugby Champions Cup
  Leinster defeated  Racing 92 15–12 in the final at Bilbao for their first title in the Champions Cup era and fourth overall European club championship.
 January 13 – May 12: 2017–18 European Rugby Continental Shield
  Enisey-STM defeated  Heidelberger RK 24–20 in the final. Both finalists had been set to qualify for the 2018–19 European Rugby Challenge Cup, with Heidelberg to become the first German side ever to participate in that competition. However, Heidelberg were barred from the Challenge Cup due to Hans-Peter Wild's ownership of both this club and French side Stade Français.
 November 3, 2017 – March 18: / 2017–18 Anglo-Welsh Cup
  Exeter Chiefs defeated fellow English team Bath 28–11 to win their second Anglo-Welsh Cup title. This was also the final Anglo-Welsh Cup, as the Welsh Rugby Union pulled out of the competition in favour of a dedicated U-23 competition. For the English sides, it will be replaced by the Premiership Rugby Cup from 2018 to 2019.
 February 17 – August 4: //// 2018 Super Rugby season
 The  Crusaders defeated the  Lions, 37–18, to win their second consecutive and ninth overall Super Rugby title.
 April 21 - July 7:  2018 Major League Rugby season (inaugural season)
 Seattle Seawolves defeated Glendale Raptors
 August 17 – October 27:  2018 Currie Cup Premier Division
 The Sharks defeated the Western Province, 17–12, to win their eighth Currie Cup title.
 August 17 – October 27:  2018 Mitre 10 Cup
 Team Auckland defeated team Canterbury, 40–33 at extra time, to win their second Mitre 10 Cup title.
 September 1 – October 27: / 2018 National Rugby Championship
  Fijian Drua defeated  Queensland Country, 36–26, to win their first National Rugby Championship title.

See also
2018 in sports

References

External links
 World Rugby Official Site

 
Years of the 21st century in rugby union
2018 sport-related lists